Fogo Airport may refer to:
Fogo Aerodrome in Newfoundland, Canada
São Filipe Airport, on the Cape Verde island of Fogo